The Congress of Coahuila is the state legislature of Coahuila, a state of Mexico. The Congress is unicameral.

The Congress has 25 members: 16 elected in single-member districts via first-past-the-post voting and 9 elected via proportional representation.

Current composition by party
The LXI Legislature of the Congress of Coahuila consists of 25 deputies.

See also
List of Mexican state congresses

External links
Official website

Government of Coahuila
Coahuila
Coahuila